Marin Barbu (born 27 September 1958) is a Romanian football coach and former footballer. During his football career, Marin Barbu played, among others, for Steaua București and FCM Brașov. He left his position as head coach of Dunărea Giurgiu on 12 January 2010.

In April 2013, he was the head coach of Astra Giurgiu for only one game, being dismissed after a week.

From April 2014 till August 2014 he was the head coach of Ceahlăul Piatra Neamț.

Honours

Player
Oltul Sfântu Gheorghe
 Divizia C: 1979–80

Manager
IMASA Sfântu Gheorghe
 Divizia D – Covasna County: 1992–93
Precizia Săcele
 Divizia C: 1995–96
 Divizia D – Brașov County: 1994–95
Foresta Suceava
 Divizia B: 1999–00

References

1958 births
Living people
Footballers from Bucharest
Romanian footballers
Association football midfielders
FC Steaua București players
FC Brașov (1936) players
Liga I players
Romanian football managers
FC Brașov (1936) managers
FC Petrolul Ploiești managers
CSM Ceahlăul Piatra Neamț managers
FC UTA Arad managers
FC Astra Giurgiu managers
ACS Foresta Suceava managers
US Chaouia managers
ASC Daco-Getica București managers
Sepsi OSK Sfântu Gheorghe managers
Romanian expatriate football managers
Expatriate football managers in Algeria
Romanian expatriate sportspeople in Algeria